Odontesthes regia is a fish belonging to the family Atherinopsidae, commonly referred to in English as Chilean silverside, Peruvian silverside or sea silverside, and in Spanish as pejerrey or pejerrey de mar.

This is an epipelagic species distributed from the north Pacific coast of Peru to the Aysén Region, in Chile. The species has great economic importance as a fresh staple food. Although the family Atherinopsidae includes 104 species (13 genera), only 17 species have been cytogenetically studied to date; cytogenetic studies in this group are still scarce.

References

regia
Taxa named by Alexander von Humboldt
Fish described in 1821